Live at Orion is a 1999 live album by Californian progressive rock band Djam Karet.

Track listing

Personnel 
Adapted from Live at Orion liner notes.

Djam Karet
 Gayle Ellett – electric guitar, keyboards, electronics, mixing
 Mike Henderson – electric guitar
 Chuck Oken Jr. – drums, keyboards, electronics
 Henry J. Osborne – bass guitar

Production and additional personnel
 Gary Fick – cover art
 Matt Murman – mastering
 Mike Potter – recording, mixing

Release history

References

External links 
 Live at Orion at Discogs (list of releases)
 Live at Orion at Bandcamp

1999 live albums
Djam Karet albums
Cuneiform Records live albums